In Greek mythology, Leucippe ( means 'white horse') is the name of the following individuals:

Leucippe, one of the 3,000 Oceanids, water-nymph daughters of the Titans Oceanus and his sister-spouse Tethys. Leucippe, along with her sisters, was one of the companions of Persephone when the maiden was abducted by Hades, the god of the Underworld.
Leucippe, one of the Minyades, daughter of King Minyas of Orchomenus.
Leucippe, the wife of King Thestius of Pleuron and mother of Iphiclus and Althaea.
Leucippe, was a queen of Troy as the wife of Ilus, founder of Ilium. By him, she became the mother of Laomedon and possibly, Themiste, Telecleia and Tithonus. In some accounts, the wife of Ilus was called Eurydice, daughter of Adrastus or Batia, daughter of Teucer.
Leucippe, the wife of Laomedon. According to Apollodorus of Athens, she and Laomedon had five sons, Tithonus, Lampus, Clytius, Hicetaon, and Priam, and three daughters, Hesione, Cilla and Astyoche. Otherwise the wife of Laomedon was identified as Strymo, daughter of Scamander or Placia, daughter of Otreus or Zeuxippe.
Leucippe, a daughter of Thestor and possibly Polymele, and thus, sister of Theonoe, Calchas and Theoclymenus. She became a priestess of Apollo and went from country to country in search of her father, Thestor and sister Theonoe who was stolen by pirates.
Leucippe, mother of Egyptian king, Aegyptus by Hephaestus.
Leucippe, mother of Teuthras the Mysian king. Her son killed a sacred boar of Artemis during hunt and was driven mad by the angry goddess. Lysippe then went out in the woods, seeking to find out what had happened to her son. Eventually she learned about the goddess' wrath from the seer Polyidus; she then sacrificed to the goddess to propitiate her, and Teuthras' sanity was restored.
Leucippe, the wife of Euenor and mother of Cleito in Plato' s legend of Atlantis.
Leucippe, the heroine of The Adventures of Leucippe and Cleitophon by Achilles Tatius

Notes

References
Apollodorus, The Library with an English Translation by Sir James George Frazer, F.B.A., F.R.S. in 2 Volumes, Cambridge, MA, Harvard University Press; London, William Heinemann Ltd. 1921. ISBN 0-674-99135-4. Online version at the Perseus Digital Library. Greek text available from the same website.
Gaius Julius Hyginus, Fabulae from The Myths of Hyginus translated and edited by Mary Grant. University of Kansas Publications in Humanistic Studies. 1960. Online version at the Topos Text Project.
Lucius Mestrius Plutarchus, Morals translated from the Greek by several hands. Corrected and revised by. William W. Goodwin, PH. D. Boston. Little, Brown, and Company. Cambridge. Press Of John Wilson and son. 1874. 5. Online version at the Perseus Digital Library.
Plato, Critias in Plato in Twelve Volumes, Vol. 9 translated by W.R.M. Lamb. Cambridge, Massachusetts, Harvard University Press; London, William Heinemann Ltd. 1925. Online version at the Perseus Digital Library. Greek text available at the same website.

Oceanids
Greek mythological priestesses
Queens in Greek mythology
Trojans
Atlanteans
Argive characters in Greek mythology
Egyptian characters in Greek mythology
Atlantis